France has a rich selection of Gold and Silver commemorative coins.  These coins are minted by Monnaie de Paris, which is a state owned industrial and commercial company.  Monnaie de Paris has a distinctive different mark (the horn of plenty) guaranteeing  "Monnaie de Paris’s quality, origin and authenticity of its collector coins".  A second mark, representing the symbol of Master Engraver, Hubert Lariviere, which is engraved on their coins; the French horn, a few waves and a fish's silhouette. Mr. Lariviere has since retired.

Due to the large number of coins released every year, each set of coins, grouped by years, are being described on their own article as shown in the following list.

Coins issued in 2002
Coins issued in 2003
Coins issued in 2004
Coins issued in 2005
Coins issued in 2006
Coins issued in 2007
Coins issued in 2008

These articles however, do not cover neither the French €2 commemorative coins nor the French franc commemorative coins.  Also, other countries' euro Gold and Silver collections can be seen here.

In May 2008, besides the shortage of one-ounce round blanks of silver at the U.S. Mint and the Royal Canadian Mint, the French Mint has confirmed that they will mint several 5, 15 and 100 euro coins in 2009.  The Paris Mint and the national postal service said Tuesday that 5-euro and 15-euro coins will be available in silver while the 100-euro coin will be in gold.

Interesting enough, a further limited set of gold and silver coins will be issued by 2010, with the highest value a gold 500-euro coin was also recently announce by the French Mint.

Notes

References

 
 

France
Coins of France